I. C. Norcom High School is a public high school in Portsmouth, Virginia. It is administered by Portsmouth City Public Schools. The school colors are maroon and grey, and the mascot is the Greyhounds. The school was named after Israel Charles Norcom, its first supervising principal.

I. C. Norcom High School is at 1801 London Boulevard conveniently between the revitalized downtown and the Midtown Tunnel. It was opened September 1997 under the leadership of Walter Taylor. The first graduating class of the new location was the class of 1998, but the first graduating class that attended four years at this school was the class of 2002.

 
Norcom is known for their boys basketball team, which won the 2010 and 2011 VSHL State Championship in Division AAA. The Greyhounds won four straight championships from 2014 to 2017, the first two in division 4A, the others in Division 3A. Norcom's football team also won the 1993 state championship, defeating Langley High School 19-0.

I. C. Norcom has a well-decorated NJROTC unit. They came in first place in the 2013 Fishbowl parade. They earned top spots in many current competitions and events.

References

Schools in Portsmouth, Virginia
Educational institutions established in 1913
Historically segregated African-American schools in Virginia
Public high schools in Virginia
Magnet schools in Virginia
1913 establishments in Virginia